The following is a list of public and private colleges and universities in the state of New York.



Public colleges and universities

State University of New York (SUNY)

SUNY University Centers
 Binghamton University
 Stony Brook University
 University at Albany
 University at Buffalo

SUNY Specialized Doctoral Granting Units
 State University of New York Upstate Medical University
 State University of New York Downstate Health Sciences University
 State University of New York College of Environmental Science and Forestry
 State University of New York State College of Optometry
 State University of New York Polytechnic Institute, Marcy

SUNY Technology Colleges
 Alfred State College
 State University of New York at Canton
 State University of New York at Cobleskill
 State University of New York at Delhi
 State University of New York at Farmingdale
 State University of New York at Morrisville
 State University of New York Maritime College

SUNY Comprehensive Colleges
 Buffalo State University
 Empire State College, Saratoga Springs
 State University of New York at Brockport
 State University of New York at Cortland
 State University of New York at Fredonia
 State University of New York at Geneseo
 State University of New York at New Paltz
 State University of New York at Old Westbury
 State University of New York at Oneonta
 State University of New York at Oswego
 State University of New York at Plattsburgh
 State University of New York at Potsdam
 State University of New York at Purchase

SUNY Community Colleges
 Adirondack Community College
 Broome Community College
 Cayuga County Community College
 Clinton Community College
 Columbia-Greene Community College
 Corning Community College
 Dutchess Community College 
 Erie Community College
 Fashion Institute of Technology, Chelsea, Manhattan
 Finger Lakes Community College
 Fulton-Montgomery Community College 
 Genesee Community College
 Herkimer County Community College
 Hudson Valley Community College 
 Jamestown Community College
 Jefferson Community College 
 Mohawk Valley Community College
 Monroe Community College
 Nassau Community College
 Niagara County Community College
 North Country Community College 
 Onondaga Community College
 Orange County Community College
 Rockland Community College 
 Schenectady County Community College
 Suffolk County Community College
 Sullivan County Community College
 Tompkins Cortland Community College 
 Ulster County Community College
 Westchester Community College

SUNY State-wide Colleges
 Empire State College
 SUNY Learning Network

City University of New York (CUNY) 

CUNY Senior Colleges and Graduate Schools
 Baruch College, Gramercy Park
 Brooklyn College
 City College, Harlem
 College of Staten Island
 CUNY Graduate Center, Fifth Avenue at 34th Street
 CUNY Graduate School of Journalism, Midtown Manhattan
 CUNY Law School, Long Island City
 CUNY School of Medicine
 CUNY School of Professional Studies
 CUNY School of Public Health
 CUNY William E. Macaulay Honors College
 Hunter College, Upper East Side
 John Jay College of Criminal Justice, Midtown Manhattan
 Lehman College, The Bronx
 Medgar Evers College, Crown Heights, Brooklyn
 New York City College of Technology at MetroTech, Downtown Brooklyn
 Queens College, Flushing
 York College, Jamaica, Queens

CUNY Community Colleges
 Borough of Manhattan Community College, Tribeca
 Bronx Community College, University Heights, Bronx
 Guttman Community College, Midtown Manhattan
 Hostos Community College, South Bronx
 Kingsborough Community College, Manhattan Beach, Brooklyn
 LaGuardia Community College, Hunters Point, Long Island City
 Queensborough Community College, Bayside, Queens

Public campuses operated by private institutions 
(SUNY Statutory Colleges)

At Alfred University
 New York State College of Ceramics

At Cornell University
 New York State College of Agriculture and Life Sciences
 New York State College of Human Ecology
 New York State College of Veterinary Medicine
 New York State School of Industrial and Labor Relations

Federal service academies 

 United States Merchant Marine Academy, Kings Point
 United States Military Academy, West Point

Non-sectarian private colleges and universities (not for profit) 

 Adelphi University, Garden City
 Albany College of Pharmacy and Health Sciences
 Albany campus
 Albany Law School
 Albany Medical College
 Alfred University, Alfred
 American Museum of Natural History
 Richard Gilder Graduate School, Upper West Side
 Bank Street College of Education (graduate school), Morningside Heights, Manhattan, next to Columbia University
 Bard College, Annandale-on-Hudson
 Barnard College, Morningside Heights, Manhattan, across the street from Columbia University
 Brooklyn Law School, Brooklyn Heights
 Cazenovia College, Cazenovia
 Clarkson University, Potsdam
 Cold Spring Harbor Laboratory, North Shore, Long Island
 Watson School of Biological Sciences (graduate school)
 Colgate University, Hamilton
 Columbia University, Morningside Heights
 Columbia College
 Columbia Business School
 Columbia Law School
 Columbia Graduate School of Architecture, Planning and Preservation
 Fu Foundation School of Engineering and Applied Science
 Columbia Graduate School of Arts and Sciences
 School of the Arts
 Columbia Climate School
 Graduate School of Journalism
 School of General Studies
 School of Social Work
 Teachers College
 School of International and Public Affairs
 School of Professional Studies
 College of Physicians and Surgeons
 School of Nursing
 College of Dental Medicine
 Mailman School of Public Health
 Cooper Union, East Village, Manhattan
 Cornell University, Ithaca
 Cornell Tech, Manhattan
 Weill Cornell Graduate School of Medical Sciences, Manhattan
 Weill Cornell Medicine, Upper East Side
 Culinary Institute of America
 Hyde Park campus, Hyde Park
 Daemen University, Amherst
 Elmira College, Elmira
 Excelsior College, Albany
 Hamilton College, Clinton
 Hartwick College, Oneonta
 Helene Fuld College of Nursing, Harlem
 Hobart and William Smith Colleges, Geneva
 Hofstra University, Hempstead
 Frank G. Zarb School of Business
 Icahn School of Medicine at Mount Sinai (graduate only), Upper East Side, Manhattan
 Ithaca College
 School of Music
 School of Humanities and Sciences
 Juilliard School, Lincoln Center for the Performing Arts, Manhattan
 Keuka College, Keuka Park
 Long Island University
 LIU Post (formerly C.W. Post), Brookville
 LIU Brooklyn
 Manhattan School of Music, Morningside Heights (Columbia University area)
 Manhattanville College
 Marist College, Poughkeepsie
 Marymount Manhattan College, Upper East Side, Manhattan, near Hunter College
 Medaille University, Buffalo
 Mercy College (New York), Dobbs Ferry
 Metropolitan College of New York
 Lower Manhattan at 60 West Street (main campus)
 The Bronx (extension campus)
 Nazareth College, Pittsford, near Rochester
 The New School, Lower Manhattan
 School for Social Research
 Eugene Lang College, School for Liberal Arts
 College of Performing Arts
 Mannes School of Music
 School of Jazz
 School of Drama
 The Schools of Public Engagement
 Parsons School of Design
 New York Academy of Art
 Northeast College of Health Sciences, Seneca Falls
 New York Institute of Technology
 Old Westbury campus
 Central Islip campus
 Columbus Circle, Manhattan campus
 New York Law School
 New York School of Interior Design
 New York University, West Village, Manhattan
 College of Arts & Science
 Graduate School of Arts and Science
 Liberal Studies
 College of Dentistry
 Courant Institute of Mathematical Sciences
 Gallatin School of Individualized Study
 Grossman School of Medicine
 Institute of Fine Arts
 Stern School of Business
 Wagner Graduate School of Public Service
 Rory Meyers College of Nursing
 School of Professional Studies
 School of Law
 Silver School of School of Social Work
 Steinhardt School of Culture, Education, and Human Development
 Tandon School of Engineering
 Tisch School of the Arts
 Pace University
 Manhattan campus
 Pleasantville campus
 White Plains campus
 Paul Smith's College, Paul Smiths
 Pratt Institute, Clinton Hill, Brooklyn
 Rensselaer Polytechnic Institute, Troy
 Rochester Institute of Technology, Henrietta
 Russell Sage College, Albany and Troy
 Sarah Lawrence College, Yonkers
 Skidmore College, Saratoga Springs
Syracuse University
College of Arts & Sciences
College of Engineering and Computer Science
College of Law
College of Professional Studies
College of Visual and Performing Arts
Falk College of Sport and Human Dynamics
Graduate School
Maxwell School of Citizenship and Public Affairs
Newhouse School of Public Communications
School of Architecture
School of Education
School of Information Studies (iSchool)
Whitman School of Management
 St. John Fisher College, Pittsford
 St. Lawrence University, Canton
 St. Thomas Aquinas College, Sparkill
 University of Rochester
 Eastman School of Music
 College of Arts Sciences and Engineering
 Margaret Warner Graduate School of Education and Human Development
 Simon Business School
 Union College, Schenectady
 Utica University
 Vassar College, Poughkeepsie
 Vaughn College of Aeronautics and Technology, East Elmhurst, Queens
 Webb Institute, Glen Cove
 Wells College, Aurora

Private colleges and academies (for profit) 
ASA College, White Plains/Midtown Manhattan/Downtown Brooklyn
Berkeley College, Midtown Manhattan/Brooklyn
Bryant & Stratton College, Liverpool
Five Towns College, Dix Hills
Globe Institute of Technology, Manhattan
LIM College, Midtown Manhattan
Monroe College, Bronx/New Rochelle
New York Film Academy, Manhattan

Religious affiliated/oriented private institutions

Roman Catholic

Christian Brothers 
 Iona University, New Rochelle

Congregation of the Mission 
 Niagara University, Lewiston
 St. John's University

De La Salle Brothers 
 Manhattan College, The Bronx

Dominican Sisters of Blauvelt 
 Dominican University New York, Orangeburg
 Molloy University, Rockville Centre
 Mount Saint Mary College, Newburgh

Felician Sisters 
 Villa Maria College, Buffalo

Franciscan 
 Hilbert College, Hamburg
 Siena College, Loudonville
 St. Bonaventure University, Allegany
 St. Francis College, Brooklyn Heights

Grey Nuns
 D'Youville University, Buffalo

Jesuit
 Canisius College, Buffalo
 Le Moyne College, Syracuse
 Fordham University
 Rose Hill campus, The Bronx
 Lincoln Center campus, Manhattan

Sisters of Charity of New York
 College of Mount Saint Vincent, Riverdale

Sisters of Mercy
 Trocaire College, Buffalo

Sisters of St. Joseph
 College of St. Rose, Albany
 St. Joseph's University

Protestant

Christian and Missionary Alliance
 Alliance University (formerly Nyack College), New York City

Episcopal
 General Theological Seminary, Chelsea, Manhattan

Lutheran
 Wagner College, Staten Island

Methodist
 Roberts Wesleyan College, Chili, near Rochester

Nondenominational Christianity
 King's College, Financial District, Manhattan

Non-denominational progressive Christian
 Union Theological Seminary, Morningside Heights (Columbia University area)
 New York Theological Seminary at The Interchurch Center and Union Theological Seminary

Southern Baptist Convention
 Davis College, Johnson City

Wesleyan
 Houghton University, Houghton

Judaism

Conservative Judaism
 Jewish Theological Seminary of America, Morningside Heights (Columbia University area)

Orthodox Judaism
 Touro University
Manhattan campus
 New York Medical College
Law Center, Central Islip
College of Osteopathic Medicine, Harlem
Lander College for Men, Kew Gardens Hills, Queens
Lander College for Women – The Anna Ruth and Mark Hasten School, Upper East Side
Lander Institute, Jerusalem, Israel
 Yeshiva University
 Stern College for Women, Murray Hill, Manhattan
 Yeshiva College, Washington Heights, Manhattan
 Sy Syms School of Business, Washington Heights, Manhattan
 Rabbi Isaac Elchanan Theological Seminary
 Benjamin N. Cardozo School of Law
 Montefiore Medical Center and Yeshiva University
 Albert Einstein College of Medicine, Morris Park, Bronx

Reform Judaism
 Hebrew Union College-Jewish Institute of Religion, Greenwich Village
 The Debbie Friedman School of Sacred Music

Defunct institutions (recent)

Private, non-sectarian colleges and academies 
Bramson ORT College, Forest Hills (1979-2017) 
Dowling College, Oakdale (1968–2016) 
Institute of Design and Construction (1947–2015), Brooklyn
Kirkland College, Clinton, New York (1968–1978); absorbed by Hamilton College in 1978
Union Graduate College, Schenectady (1905-2016), merged with Clarkson University

Private colleges and academies (for profit) 
 Briarcliffe College (1966–2018)
 Queens at Long Island City
 Nassau at Bethpage
 Suffolk at Patchogue
Utica School of Commerce (1896–2016)
 Gibbs College (1911–2009)
 New York City campus
 Melville campus

Private religious institutions

Roman Catholic
College of New Rochelle, New Rochelle (1904-2019) 
 Maria Regina College (1934–1990), Syracuse
 St. Pius X Preparatory Seminary (1961–1984), initially Hempstead, then Uniondale
 St. Anthony-on-Hudson Seminary (1912–1988), Rensselaer

Lutheran Church–Missouri Synod
 Concordia College (1881–2021), Bronxville

Listed by geographical region

New York City 

 The Ailey School (Alvin Ailey American Dance Crew).
 Albert Einstein College of Medicine
 American Academy of Dramatic Arts
 American Academy McAllister Institute
 American Musical and Dramatic Academy
 ASA College 
 Bank Street College of Education
 Bard College 
 Bard Graduate Center
Globalization and International Affairs Program
 Barnard College
 Berkeley College
 Bethel Seminary of the East
 Boricua College
 Bramson ORT College
 Briarcliffe College - The Queens Center
 Brooklyn Law School
 Christie's Education
 City University of New York (CUNY) (24 campuses)
 Baruch College
 Borough of Manhattan Community College
 Bronx Community College
 Brooklyn College
 City College of New York
 College of Staten Island
 CUNY Graduate Center
 CUNY Graduate School of Journalism
 CUNY School of Law (at Queens College)
 CUNY School of Professional Studies
 CUNY School of Public Health
 CUNY William E. Macaulay Honors College
 Stella and Charles Guttman Community College (first CUNY community college opened in over 40 years)
 Hostos Community College
 Hunter College
 John Jay College of Criminal Justice
 Kingsborough Community College
 LaGuardia Community College
 Lehman College
 Medgar Evers College
 New York City College of Technology
 Queens College
 Queensborough Community College
 York College
 College of Mount Saint Vincent
 College of New Rochelle (School of New Resources)
 Columbia University
 Teachers College
 Union Theological Seminary
Columbia University School of General Studies
 Cooper Union
 Cornell University
 Cornell NYC Tech
 Weill Cornell Graduate School of Medical Sciences
 Weill Cornell Medical College
 DeVry University
 European School of Economics
 Fordham University
 Frank G. Zarb School of Business at Hofstra University 
 General Theological Seminary
 Gerstner Sloan Kettering Graduate School of Biomedical Science
 Globe Institute of Technology
 Hebrew Union College
 Helene Fuld College of Nursing
 Institute of Design and Construction
 Icahn School of Medicine at Mount Sinai
 Jewish Theological Seminary of America
 The Juilliard School
 Keller Graduate School of Management
 The King's College
 Laboratory Institute of Merchandising
 Long Island Business Institute - Flushing
 Long Island College Hospital School of Nursing
 Long Island University
 Mandl College of Allied Health
 Manhattan College
 Manhattan School of Music
 Marymount Manhattan College
 Mercy College
 Metropolitan College of New York
 Monroe College
 The New School
 Eugene Lang College The New School for Liberal Arts
 Mannes College The New School for Music
 Milano School of Management, Policy, and Environment
 The New School for Drama
 The New School for General Studies
 The New School for Jazz and Contemporary Music
 The New School for Social Research
 Parsons The New School for Design
 New York Academy of Art
 New York Career Institute
 New York Conservatory for Dramatic Arts
 New York Graduate School of Psychoanalysis
 New York Institute of Technology
 New York Law School
 New York School of Interior Design
 New York School of Urban Ministry
 New York Theological Seminary
 New York University
 Gallatin School of Individualized Study
 New York University Tandon School of Engineering
 New York University School of Law
 New York University School of Medicine
 Tisch School of Arts
 New York University of Architecture
 Nyack College (School of Music)
 Pace University
 Pacific College of Oriental Medicine
 Phillips Beth Israel School of Nursing
 Plaza College
 Pratt Institute
 Rabbi Isaac Elchanon Theological Seminary
 Richard Gilder Graduate School - American Museum of Natural History
 Rockefeller University
 School of American Ballet
 School of Visual Arts
 St. Francis College
 St. John's University
 New Brunswick Theological Seminary
 St. Joseph's University
 Sotheby's Institute of Art
 State University of New York (multiple campuses)
 Fashion Institute of Technology
 SUNY College of Optometry
 SUNY Downstate Medical Center
 SUNY Empire State College (The Harry Van Arsdale Jr. Center for Labor Studies)
 SUNY Maritime College
 Studio Maestro
 Swedish Institute of Massage Therapy
 Technical Career Institute College of Technology
 Touro College
 Tri-State College of Acupuncture
 Vaughn College of Aeronautics & Technology
 Wagner College
 Wood Tobe-Coburn School
 Yeshiva University
 Benjamin N. Cardozo School of Law

Long Island 

 Adelphi University
 DeVry University
 Five Towns College
 Farmingdale State College
 Hofstra University
 Long Island University, C.W. Post Campus
 Molloy College
 New York Institute of Technology
 New York University Tandon School of Engineering - has a "Long Island Graduate Center" in Suffolk, at Melville
 Saint Joseph's College (Suffolk Campus)
 State University of New York at Old Westbury
 Stony Brook University
 Touro Law Center
 Watson School of Biological Sciences, at Cold Spring Harbor Laboratory
 Webb Institute, f/k/a Webb Institute of Naval Architecture

See also

 List of colleges and universities in New York City
 Education in New York (state)
 City University of New York
 List of City University of New York institutions
 State University of New York
 List of State University of New York units
 Higher education in the United States
 List of college athletic programs in New York
 List of American institutions of higher education
 List of recognized higher education accreditation organizations
 List of colleges and universities
 List of honors colleges and programs in New York

References

External links
 Department of Education listing of accredited institutions in New York
 "U.S. Not-For-Profit Private Universities Fiscal 2016 Median Ratios: A Stable Sector Despite Uncertainties," S&P Global, July 20, 2017

New York

Colleges